Raúl Medina Zamora (born 10 March 1983 in Arganda del Rey, Madrid) is a Spanish former professional footballer who played as a defensive midfielder.

External links

1983 births
Living people
People from Arganda del Rey
Spanish footballers
Footballers from the Community of Madrid
Association football midfielders
La Liga players
Segunda División players
Segunda División B players
Atlético Madrid B players
Atlético Madrid footballers
Ciudad de Murcia footballers
Xerez CD footballers
CD Puertollano footballers
CP Cacereño players
Coruxo FC players
Spain youth international footballers